Texte en italique
Tienko is a town in northwestern Ivory Coast. It is a sub-prefecture and commune of Minignan Department in Folon Region, Denguélé District.

In 2014, the population of the sub-prefecture of Tienko was 12,042.

Villages
The 13 villages of the sub-prefecture of Tienko and their population in 2014 are:

References

Sub-prefectures of Folon Region
Communes of Folon Region